Robert Emmet Lucey (March 16, 1891 – August 1, 1977) was an American prelate of the Roman Catholic Church.  He served as the second bishop of the Diocese of Amarillo in Texas from 1934 to 1941 and as the second archbishop of Archdiocese of San Antonio in Texas from 1941 to 1969.

Biography

Early life 
Lucey was born in Los Angeles, California to John Joseph and Marie Lucey on March 16, 1891.  He began his college education at St. Vincent's College and completed the rest at Saint Patrick's Seminary in Menlo Park, California in 1912.  Lucey then went to Rome to reside at the Pontifical North American College.  In 1916, he received a Doctor of Sacred Theology degree at the University of the Propaganda there.

Priesthood 
On May 14, 1916, Lucey was ordained a priest in the Church of St. Apollinaris in Rome by Archbishop Giuseppe Cepetelli.

During the next five years in Los Angeles, Lucey was assistant pastor of several parishes which included St. Vibiana's Cathedral, Immaculate Conception Parish, Immaculate Heart of Mary Parish, and St. Anthony's in Long Beach. Among the positions that he held were chaplain of the Newman Club at the University of Los Angeles and diocesan director of Catholic Charities (1921–1925) of the California Conference of Social Work (1923–24), director of Catholic Hospitals for the diocese (1924–1934), and board member of the California State Department of Social Welfare (1924–1930).

Bishop of Amarillo 
Lucey was appointed bishop of the Diocese of Amarillo on February 10, 1934. On March 1, 1934, Archbishop Amleto Cicognani, consecrated Lucey at St. Vibiana's Cathedral in Los Angeles. There he established a newspaper called the Texas Panhandle Register.

Archbishop of San Antonio 
On January 23, 1941 Pope Pius XII appointed Lucey Archbishop of San Antonio. He was installed by Cicognani at the Cathedral of San Fernando in San Antonio on March 27, 1941. Lucey helped establish the Yorktown Memorial Hospital in Yorktown, Texas, the Czech Catholic Home for the Aged, and the Huth Memorial Hospital and created 29 clinics throughout Southwest Texas.

In the early 1950's, Lucey ordered the racial integration of all schools in the archdiocese.  He also stipulated that the archdiocese only use unionized labor for its construction projects and supported union organizing efforts by farm workers in Texas.  In 1965, he gave his full support to the national War on Poverty program of the Johnson Administration.  Furey cofounded the juvenile rehabilitation program the Patrician Movement and created the equal play advocacy organization Project Equality in 1965.

In September 1968, while dedicating a new church rectory in Stonewall, Texas, with President Lyndon Johnson in attendance, Lucey praised the US involvement in the Vietnam War, contending that it reflected the peace efforts of Pope Paul VI. However, the pope had previously called on Johnson to stop the bombing of North Vietnam.  Lucey later took a trip to Saigon to serve as an observer to the presidential election in what was then South Vietnam.

Retirement and legacy 
On July 4, 1969, Paul VI accepted Lucey's resignation as archbishop of San Antonio. Robert Lucey died in San Antonio on August 1, 1977.  He was buried at Holy Cross Cemetery, which had been built on a plot of land in Bexar County that he'd acquired for the church.

References

External links
  

1891 births
1977 deaths
People from Los Angeles
20th-century Roman Catholic archbishops in the United States
Participants in the Second Vatican Council
Roman Catholic bishops of Amarillo
Roman Catholic archbishops of San Antonio
Catholics from California